The National Alliance Of Postal and Federal Employees (NAPFE) is a labor union in the United States.

The union was founded on October 6, 1913 in Chattanooga, Tennessee.  It initially represented African-American workers for the railway mail service.  From 1923, it admitted all African-Americans in the United States Postal Service, and became the National Alliance of Postal Employees.  By 1925, it had 1,700 members.

Over time, the union began representing some government workers outside the postal service, and so adopted its current name.  By 1968, it had grown to 32,000 members, most of whom were African-American.

The union is affiliated with the International Trade Union Confederation.

References

External links 
 NAPFE official site

Trade unions in the United States
International Trade Union Confederation
United States Postal Service
Trade unions established in 1913
Postal trade unions
1913 establishments in the United States